Jeris Lee Poindexter (born December 22, 1950) is an American actor, comedian and musician. He is known for his recurring role as Kill Moves on the UPN/The CW sitcom Everybody Hates Chris.

Filmography

Film

Television

References

External links

Living people
African-American male actors
American male film actors
American male television actors
Place of birth missing (living people)
1950 births
21st-century African-American people
20th-century African-American people